Craig Blackburn is an Australian Paralympic swimmer with a vision impairment. At the 1984 New York/Stoke Mandeville Games, he won three silver medals in the Men's 100 m Butterfly B3, Men's 100 m Freestyle B3, and Men's 400 m Freestyle B3 events.

References

Male Paralympic swimmers of Australia
Swimmers at the 1984 Summer Paralympics
Medalists at the 1984 Summer Paralympics
Paralympic silver medalists for Australia
Paralympic medalists in swimming
Paralympic swimmers with a vision impairment
Australian male freestyle swimmers
Australian male butterfly swimmers
Australian blind people
Year of birth missing (living people)
Living people